Alan Thomas Christie (14 June 1905 – 9 January 2002) was a Canadian sprinter. He competed in the men's 400 metres at the 1924 Summer Olympics.

References

External links
 

1905 births
2002 deaths
Athletes (track and field) at the 1924 Summer Olympics
Canadian male sprinters
Olympic track and field athletes of Canada
Athletes from Hamilton, Ontario